Vasil Velev (born 15 January 1984) is a Bulgarian footballer who plays as a midfielder for Botev Ihtiman.

References

External links

1984 births
Living people
Bulgarian footballers
First Professional Football League (Bulgaria) players
PFC Spartak Varna players
PFC Minyor Pernik players
OFC Sliven 2000 players
PFC Vidima-Rakovski Sevlievo players
FC Lokomotiv 1929 Sofia players
FC Botev Vratsa players
FC Haskovo players
FC Oborishte players
Association football midfielders
Sportspeople from Stara Zagora